The WWA Heavyweight Championship was a professional wrestling heavyweight championship in the World Wrestling Alliance (WWA). It remained active until November 13, 2010, when the WWA held its final show.

The inaugural champion was "The Graduate" Timothy McNeany, who defeated Mike Steele and Kevin Kelley in a three-way ladder match on June 16, 2000, to become the first WWA Heavyweight Champion. McNeany holds the record for most reigns, with three. At 518 days, Anthony "Prime Time" Sparta's first and only reign is the longest in the title's history. Both Aaron Stevens and Damien HS Darling have the shortest reigns in the history of the title each lasting only one day. Overall, there have been 14 reigns shared between 10 wrestlers, with three vacancies, and 1 deactivation.

Title history
Key

Names

Reigns

List of combined reigns

Footnotes

References
General

Specific

External links
WWAnewengland.com
WWAentertainment.net

Heavyweight wrestling championships